Lasariya is a patwar circle and village in ILRC Nimera in Phagi Tehsil in Jaipur district, Rajasthan. Lasariya is also a patwar circle for nearby village, Palri.

In Lasariya, there are 333 households with total population of 2,327 (with 50.71% males and 49.29% females), based on 2011 census. Total area of village is 16.64 km2.  There is one primary school in Lasariya village.

References

Villages in Jaipur district